Cape Davies is an ice-covered cape, lying at the northeast end of Hughes Peninsula, on the north side of Thurston Island, Antarctica. The cape plotted from air photos taken by U.S. Navy Operation Highjump in December 1946 and named by the Advisory Committee on Antarctic Names (US-ACAN). The capewas named for Frank Davies, physicist with the Byrd Antarctic Expedition (ByrdAE) in 1928-30.

Maps
 Thurston Island – Jones Mountains. 1:500000 Antarctica Sketch Map. US Geological Survey, 1967.
 Antarctic Digital Database (ADD). Scale 1:250000 topographic map of Antarctica. Scientific Committee on Antarctic Research (SCAR), 1993–2016.

References

Davies